Alexey Igorevich Kostenko (born 19 November 1984) is a Russian former footballer.

Club career
Kostenko previously played for FC Spartak Nalchik in the Russian Premier League and SKA Rostov-on-Don in the Russian First Division.

Playing career

* - played games and goals

References

1984 births
Footballers from Moscow
Living people
Russian footballers
Russia under-21 international footballers
Association football midfielders
Dinaburg FC players
Expatriate footballers in Latvia
PFC Spartak Nalchik players
FC SKA Rostov-on-Don players
Russian expatriate footballers
FC Metallurg Lipetsk players
FC Tyumen players
Russian Premier League players